Valéria Dénes (1877 in Budapest – 1915 in Pécs) was a Hungarian painter. The wife of Sándor Galimberti, she was one of the first Hungarian cubists.

References

Further reading

External links

 Valéria Dénes in Hungarian Wikipedia

1877 births
1915 deaths
Hungarian women artists
Artists from Budapest
20th-century Hungarian painters
20th-century Hungarian women artists